Crocus ilvensis  is a species of flowering plant in the genus Crocus of the family Iridaceae. It is a cormous perennial endemic to Elba Island (Tuscan Archipelago, Italy).

References

ilvensis